Monkey on My Back is a 1957 biographical film directed by Andre DeToth. It stars Cameron Mitchell as Barney Ross, a real-life world champion boxer and World War II hero. Though heavily fictionalized, the film deals with Ross's addiction to heroin.

Plot
In the 1930s, boxer Barney Ross wins the welterweight championship, then meets chorus girl Cathy Holland as he celebrates. Sam Pian, his trainer, learns that Barney placed a $10,000 bet on himself to win the fight. Barney's love interest is Cathy, a single mother of a girl named Noreen, who is unaware of his gambling habit. When Barney loses a fight, he owes thousands to a bookie named Big Ralph and is forced to work in Ralph's bar to pay the debt.

Barney joins the Marines when war breaks out. He marries Cathy before leaving for the South Pacific, where he saves another soldier's life at Guadalcanal to earn the Silver Star. But he also contracts malaria, for which a medic prescribes morphine.

Back home in Chicago, Barney takes a job with a public-relations firm by the father of the man whose life he saved. Barney is now addicted to morphine and incurs a huge debt to Rico, a drug pusher. Cathy catches her desperate husband breaking into Noreen's piggy bank, so she moves out.

Barney becomes suicidal, but when his wife returns to inform him that Rico has been arrested, he vows to beat his addiction. He checks into a hospital in Kentucky while the whole country becomes aware of his plight. Four months later, Barney is permitted to leave, rejoin his family and resume his life.

Cast
Cameron Mitchell as Barney Ross
Dianne Foster as Cathy Holland
Paul Richards as Rico (as Paul E. Richards)
Jack Albertson as Sam Pian
Kathy Garver as Noreen
Barry Kelley as Big Ralph
Dayton Lummis as J. L. McAvoy
Lewis Charles as Lew Surati
Raymond Greenleaf as Dr. A. J. Latham
Richard Benedict as Art Winch
Brad Harris as Spike McAvoy
Chris Alcaide as Benjy
 Lisa Golm as Barney's Mother

Production
Film rights to Barney Ross' story were bought in July 1955 by Imperial Pictures, a company owned by Edward Small. At the time it was titled God Was in My Corner.

The Motion Picture Association of America demanded the removal of a scene in which Barney inserts a hypodermic needle into his arm. Producer Edward Small appealed the directive and then released the film without the Production Code seal of approval, claiming that he had not heard a response to his appeal for two weeks. This made Monkey on My Back the first film to run afoul of the Production Code since the code had been revised to allow treatment of illicit narcotics within limits.

Reception
In a contemporary review for The New York Times, critic Bosley Crowther dismissed Monkey on My Back as "a serious but largely unimaginative study of one man's triumph over a horrible craving" and "by and large, unsensational drama."

See also    
 List of American films of 1957  
 List of drug films

References

External links
 
 
 

1957 films
Film noir
1950s biographical drama films
1950s sports films
American biographical drama films
American black-and-white films
Biographical films about sportspeople
American boxing films
1950s English-language films
Films about drugs
Films directed by Andre DeToth
Films produced by Edward Small
Pacific War films
United Artists films
Cultural depictions of boxers
1957 drama films
Films scored by Paul Sawtell
1950s American films